National Secondary Route 140, or just Route 140 (or ) is a National Road Route of Costa Rica, located in the Alajuela province.

Description
In Alajuela province the route covers Alajuela canton (Sarapiquí district), San Carlos canton (Quesada, Aguas Zarcas, Venecia, La Palmera districts), Río Cuarto canton (Río Cuarto district).

References

Highways in Costa Rica